Alberto Marson (February 24, 1925 – April 25, 2018) was a Brazilian basketball player. He competed in the 1948 Summer Olympics in London, United Kingdom. There, he won the bronze medal with the men's national basketball team. He was born in São Paulo in 1925. Marson died in April 2018 at the age of 93.

References

External links
Alberto Marson's profile at databaseOlympics

1925 births
2018 deaths
Brazilian men's basketball players
Basketball players at the 1948 Summer Olympics
Basketball players at the 1951 Pan American Games
Medalists at the 1948 Summer Olympics
Pan American Games bronze medalists for Brazil
Pan American Games medalists in basketball
Olympic basketball players of Brazil
Olympic bronze medalists for Brazil
Olympic medalists in basketball
Basketball players from São Paulo
Medalists at the 1951 Pan American Games